The following is a list of films produced in the Tamil film industry in India in 1950, in alphabetical order.

1950

References

Films, Tamil
Tamil
1950
1950s Tamil-language films